Jahn (Jähn)  is a German surname. Notable people with this surname include the following:

 Constanze Jahn (born 1963), German chess player 
 David Jahn (born 1975), Czech burlesque impresario
 Erich Jahn (born 1907), Hitler Youth leader
 Friedrich Ludwig Jahn (1778–1852), German educator, founding figure of German Turner athletic movement
 Gunnar Jahn (1883–1971), Norwegian politician and resistance member
 Gunter Jahn (1910–1992), German U-boat commander
 Hans Max Jahn (1853–1906), German physical chemist
 Helmut Jahn (1940–2021), German-American architect
 Hermann Arthur Jahn (1907–1979), British scientist
 Jan Jahn (1739–1802), Czech painter and art historian
 Jeff Jahn (born 1970), American artist and critic
 Johann Jahn (1750–1816), German Orientalist
 Kurt Jahn (1892–1966), German general
 Marie-Luise Jahn (1918–2010), German physician
 Martin Jahn (c. 1620 – c. 1682), German church musician, minister, hymnwriter
 Martin Jahn (born 1970), Czech economist and politician
 Joseph Michael Jahn (born 1943), American author and critic
 Molly Jahn, American plant scientist and food security policy advisor
 Otto Jahn (1813–1869), German archaeologist, philologist, and writer on art and music
 Patrick Jahn (born 1983), German football player
 Robert G. Jahn (1930–2017), American scientist, electrical engineer, and psychic investigator
 Ryan David Jahn (born 1979), American novelist and screenwriter
 Sigmund Jähn (1937–2019), German astronaut
 Thomas Jahn (born 1965), German film and television director
 Wilhelm Jahn (1835–1900), Austro-Hungarian orchestral conductor
 Willie Jahn (1889–1973), German athlete, leader of the Wandervogel youth movement, folksong composer, publisher, World War II army officer

German-language surnames
Surnames from given names